This is a list of defunct intelligence agencies.

Agencies by country

Afghanistan
 Khedamat-e Etelea'at-e Dawlati (KHAD) (1980–1992)
 National Directorate of Security (NDS) (2002–2021)

Albania
 Drejtorija e Sigurimit të Shtetit (Sigurimi) (Directorate of State Security) (1944–1991)

Algeria
 Direction des Services de Sécurité (1990–2016)

Argentina
 Batallón de Inteligencia 601 (601 Intelligence Battalion) (late 1970s–2000) 
 Central Nacional de Inteligencia (CNI) (National Intelligence Center)
 Coordinación de Informaciones de Estado (CIDE) (State Information Coordination)
 División de Informaciones (Information Division)
 Secretaría de Informaciones de Estado (SIDE) (Secretariat of State Information)

Austro-Hungarian Empire
 Evidenzbureau (1850–1918)

Brazil
 Serviço Nacional de Informações (SNI) (National Information Service) (1964–1990)
 Subsecretaria de Inteligência (SSI) (Sub-Secretariat of Intelligence) (1990–1995)

Bulgaria
 Durzhavna Sigurnost (DS)

Canada
 RCMP Security Service (1950–1984)

Chile
 Dirección de Inteligencia Nacional (DINA) (National Directorate of Intelligence) (1973–1977)
 Central Nacional de Inteligencia (CNI) (National Intelligence Center)

China / Taiwan
 Embroidered Uniform Guard (1368–1645)
 Eastern Depot (1420–1644)
 Bureau of Investigation and Statistics (1927–1946)
 National Committee of Investigations and Statistics (1935–1949)
 Taiwan Garrison Command

Colombia
 Departamento Administrativo de Seguridad (DAS) (Administrative Department of Security) (1960–2011)

Czechoslovakia
 Federal Directorate of Intelligence Services (FSZS)
 Hlavni Sprava Rozvedky (HSR)
 Státní Bezpečnost (StB)

Finland
 Ministry of Interior 
 Etsivä keskuspoliisi (EK, 1919–1938)
 Valtiollinen poliisi (Valpo I, 1939–1944)
 Red Valpo (Valpo II, 1944–1948)
 Finnish Defence Forces
 Intelligence Research Establishment (VKoeL, 1960–2014) – Viestikoelaitos / Signalprovanstalten
 Ministry of Defence
 Military Intelligence Service (PVTK, 2007–2014) – Pääesikunnan tiedusteluosasto

France
 Deuxième Bureau (1871–1940)
 Renseignements Généraux (RG) (1937–2008)
 Service de Documentation Extérieure et de Contre-Espionnage (SDECE) (1944–1982)
 Direction de la Surveillance du Territoire (DST) (1944–2008)

Federal Republic of Germany
 Gehlen Organization ("The Org", "Zipper") (1946–1956)
 Office/Center for Intelligence of the Federal Armed Forces (ANBw/ZNBw)

German Democratic Republic (East Germany)
 Ministerium für Staatssicherheit (MfS or Stasi) (Ministry for State Security) (1950–1990)
 Main Directorate for Reconnaissance (HVA) (1955–1990)
 Military Reconnaissance of the National People's Army (Militärische Aufklärung der Nationalen Volksarmee) (1956–1990)

German Reich
 Abwehr (1920–1945)
 Abteilung Fremde Heere Ost (Department Foreign Armies East)
 Geheime Staatspolizei (Gestapo) (Secret State Police) (1933–1945)
 Geheime Feldpolizei (GFP) (Secret Field Police) (1939–1945)
 Sicherheitsdienst (SD) (Security Service) (1931–1945) 
 B-Dienst (Observation Service) (1918–1945) 
 Naval Intelligence Service, also called Nachrichten-Abteilung (1899–1919) 
 Abteilung III b (Department III b) (1889–1918) 
 Prussian Secret Police (1851–1933)

Egypt
 State Security Investigations Service (SSIS) (1913–2011)

Hong Kong
 Special Branch (1930–1995)

Hungary
 Államvedélmi Osztály (ÁVO) (State Protection Department)
 Államvédelmi Hatóság (ÁVH) (State Protection Authority) (1945–1956)

Israel
 ha-Lishka le-Kishrei Mada (Lekem or Lakam) (Bureau of Scientific Relations) (1957–1986)

Italy
 Organizzazione per la Vigilanza e la Repressione dell'Antifascismo (OVRA) (1927–1945)

Indonesia
 Komando Pemulihan Keamanan dan Ketertiban (Kopkamtib) (1965–1988) 
 Badan Koordinasi Stabilitas Nasional (Bakorstanas) (1988–2000)

Iran
 Sazeman-i Ettelaat va Amniyat-i Keshvar (SAVAK) (National Organization for Intelligence and Security) (1957–1979)

Iraq
 Al-Amn al-‘Amm (Directorate of General Security) (1922–2003)
 Al-Amn al-Khas (Special Security Organization) (1983–2003) 
 Al-Istikhabarat al-'Askariyya (Directorate of General Military Intelligence) (1932–2003) 
 Jihaz Al-Mukhabarat Al-A'ma (Iraqi Intelligence Service) (1973–2003)

Ireland
 Free State Army Intelligence Department ("Oriel House") (1921–1923) 
 Criminal Investigation Department (CID) (1921–1923)
 Citizens' Defence Force

Japan
 Kempeitai (1881–1945) 
 Tokeitai
 Tokkō (1911–1945)

Libya
 Jamahiriya el-Mukhabarat

Malaysia
 Malayan Security Service (1939–1948)

Manchukuo
 Hoankyoku (1937–1945)

Netherlands
 Binnenlandse Veiligheidsdienst (BVD) (Interior Security Service) (1947–2002) 
 Inlichtingendienst Buitenland (IDB) (Foreign Intelligence Service) (1946–1994)

Ottoman Empire
 Teşkîlât-ı Mahsûsa (1913–1918)

Panama
 Policia Secreta Nacional (PSN) (La Secreta) (1909–60s first government secret agency)
 Guardia Silenciosa Panameñista (GUSIPA) (1930–40s short-lived secret service)
 1.Estado Mayor Personal/Sec."E" Asuntos de Seguridad Nacional of PFD General Command
 Sub Jefatura de Inspectoria General of PFD General State Major Chieftain
 Comando General de la Comision de Defensa y Seguridad (COGECODESE) (security, defense and intelligence PNG/PFD main entity)
 Estado Mayor General ('Inteligencia') (G-2) (1950–80s PNG/PDFs military intelligence)
 Departamento Nacional de Investigaciones (DENI) (1960–1989)

Philippines
 Philippine Constabulary – Office of Special Investigations (PC-OSI) (1901–1991)
 Philippine Constabulary – National Constabulary Investigations Service (PC-NCIS) (1901–1936)
 National Intelligence and Security Authority (NISA) (1972–1987)
 Civil Intelligence and Security Agency (CISA) (1972–1987)

Poland
 Oddział II Sztabu Generalnego Wojska Polskiego (1918–1939)
 Biuro Szyfrów (Cypher Bureau)
 Estezet (STZ)
 Polish Agency of Trade Information (PAIH)
 Ministerstwo Bezpieczeństwa Publicznego (1945–1954)
 Komitet do spraw Bezpieczeństwa Publicznego (1954–1956)
 Ministerstwo Spraw Wewnętrznych (MSW) (1954–1990)
 Departament I MSW
 Departament II MSW
 Służba Bezpieczeństwa MSW (SB-MSW) (1956–1990)
 Urząd Ochrony Państwa (UOP) (Office for State Protection) (1990–2001)
 Główny Zarząd Informacji Wojska Polskiego (1944–1957)
 Wojskowa Służba Wewnętrzna (WSW) (1957–1990)
 Oddział II Sztabu Generalnego LWP (1945–1951)
 Zarząd II Sztabu Generalnego Wojska Polskiego (1951–1990)

Portugal
 PIDE (1933–1969)

Federation of Rhodesia and Nyasaland
 Federal Intelligence and Security Bureau

Roman Empire
 Agentes in rebus (4th–7th century) 
 Areani
 Bureau of Barbarians
 Frumentarii
 Praetorian Guard (27 BC–312 AD)

Romania
 Secția a-II-a (Section II) (1859–1908)
 Siguranța Statului (Siguranța) (State Security) (1908–1940)
 Serviciul Special de Informații (Special Intelligence Service) (1940–1944)
 Serviciul de Informații (Intelligence Service) (1944–1948)
 Departamentul Securității Statului (Securitate) (Department of State Security) (1948–1991)

Russia
 Okhrannoye otdeleniye (Okhrana or slang Okhranka) (Security Section) (1866–1917)
 Special Corps of Gendarmes (1836–1917)
 KGB
 NKVD (1934–1946)

Serbia
 Service for Research and Documentation (SID) (Ministry of Foreign Affairs) (1949–2007)

Sri Lanka
 Special Branch (1966–1970)

Singapore
 Special Branch

Somalia
 National Security Service (NSS) (1970–1990)

South Africa
 Bureau of State Security (BOSS) (1969–1980)

Soviet Union
 Cheka (1917–1922) (All-Russian Extraordinary Commission)
 Gosudarstvennoye Politicheskoye Upravleniye (GPU) (1922–1923) (State Political Directorate)
 Obyedinennoye Gosudarstvennoye Politicheskoye Upravleniye (OGPU) (1923–1934) (Joint State Political Directorate)
 Narodnyi Kommissariat Vnutrennih Del (NKVD) (1934–1946) (People's Commissariat for Internal Affairs)
 Ministerstvo Vnutrennih Del (MVD) (1946–1954) (Ministry for Internal Affairs)
 Ministerstvo Gosudarstvennoi Bezopastnosti (MGB) (1943–1953) (Ministry for State Security)
 Komitet Gosudarstvennoi Bezopasnosti (KGB) (1954–1991) (Committee for State Security)

Spain
 Centro Superior de Información de la Defensa (CESID) (Main Defence Information Centre) (1977–2002) 
 Political-Social Brigade (BPS/BSI) (1941–1978)

Sweden
 IB ("Informationsbyrån")

Turkey
 Millî Emniyet Hizmeti Riyâseti (M.E.H./MAH, between 1926 and 1965)

Uganda
 State Research Bureau

Ukraine
 Kontrrazvedka

United Kingdom
See also: MI5 aka The Security Service and MI6 aka The Secret Intelligence Service (SIS), that still do exist; MI13 did though never exist.

 MI1
 MI2
 MI3
 MI4
 MI7
 MI8
 MI9
 MI10
 MI11
 MI12
 MI14
 MI15
 MI16
 MI17
 MI19
 Naval Intelligence Division (NID)
 Special Operations Executive (SOE)

United States
 Air Force Intelligence, Surveillance and Reconnaissance Agency (1948–2014) 
 Office of Strategic Services (OSS) (1942–1945) 
 The Pond (1942–1955)
 National Drug Intelligence Center (1993-2012)

North Vietnam
 Central Research Agency

South Vietnam
 Central Intelligence Office (1961–1975) 
 Military Security Directorate
 Strategic Technical Directorate
 Research and Documentation Office
 Intelligence Directorate

Vietnam
 Tổng cục An ninh (Tổng cục I) (General Department of Security or First General Department)
 Tổng cục Tình báo Công an (Tổng cục V, or TC V) (General Department of Public Security Intelligence or Fifth General Department)

Yugoslavia
 UDBA (1946–1991) 
 KOS (Kontraobaveštajna služba), Counterintelligence Service (General staff) (1946–1992)

See also
 List of law enforcement agencies
 Secret service
 Secret police
 List of intelligence agencies

References

 
Intelligence agencies
-